Cherthala North is a village in Alappuzha district in the Indian state of Kerala.

Demographics
 India census, Cherthala North had a population of 13259 with 6448 males and 6811 females.

References

Villages in Alappuzha district